The Rolf Wideroe Prize is awarded every third year by the Accelerator Group of the European Physical Society (EPS), in memory of Rolf Widerøe, to individuals in recognition of outstanding work in the field of accelerator physics.

The prize was awarded for the first time in 1996, but was only named the Rolf Wideroe Prize in 2011. Before this year the prize was simply referred to as EPS Accelerator Group Prizes.

Laureates

 2020: Lucio Rossi
 2017: Lyn Evans
 2014: 
 2011: Shin-Ichi Kurokawa
2008: 
2006 Vladimir Teplyakov
2004: 
2002: 
2000: Eberhard Keil
1998: Cristoforo Benvenuti
1996: R.D. Kohaupt and the DESY Feedback Group: M. Ebert, D. Heins, J. Klute, K.-H. Matthiesen, H. Musfeldt, S. Pätzold, J. Rümmler, M. Schweiger, J. Theiss

See also 

 List of physics awards

References 

Physics awards
Awards of the European Physical Society